Pedicypraedia atlantica is a species of sea snail, a marine gastropod mollusk in the family Ovulidae, one of the families of cowry allies.

Description
The length of the shell attains 5.3 mm.

Distribution
This species occurs on the Hyères Seamount, Northeast Atlantic Ocean.

References

 Lorenz, F., 2009. Two new Pediculariidae from Hyères Seamount, eastern central Atlantic (Gastropoda: Cypraeoidea). Acta Conchyliorum 10: 87-91

Pediculariinae
Gastropods described in 2009